Gonba is a rural locality (a selo) in Barnaul, Altai Krai, Russia. The population was 2,993 as of 2013. There are 29 streets.

Geography 
Gonba is located 19 km northwest of Barnaul by road. Zemlyanukha is the nearest rural locality.

References 

Rural localities in Barnaul urban okrug